Anna Radziwiłłowa (1567–1617), was a Polish magnate and court official. She was the daughter of duke Gotthard Kettler of Courland, and married Albrecht Radziwiłł in 1586. She regularly attended court and served as a lady-in-waiting to Anne of Austria, Queen of Poland, in 1593-1598.

References

 Biogram został opublikowany w 1987 r. w XXX tomie Polskiego Słownika Biograficznego.

16th-century Polish nobility
16th-century Polish women
1617 deaths
1567 births
Baltic-German people
16th-century Latvian people
Polish ladies-in-waiting
Radziwiłł family